Flughafen Zürich AG (FZAG), based in Kloten, Switzerland, is the owner and operator of Zurich Airport. It owns, co-owns and runs airports in India, Brazil, Chile, Colombia and Curaçao. The mixed-economy stock company was established in April 2000 and is listed on the SIX Swiss Exchange; the largest individual shareholder is the canton of Zürich, which must hold at least one third of the share capital at all times.

History 
Zurich Airport AG was founded to what it is today on 1 April 2000, through the fusion of the airport real estate company (Flughafen-Immobilien-Gesellschaft FIG) and the Zürich airport directorate (Flughafendirektion Zürich FDZ).

The airport real estate company FIG, whose roots date back to November 1948, was lastly a stock company (since 1984) based in Kloten, and was responsible for the construction and operation of buildings at the airport. Significant shareholders of the FIG were the Canton of Zürich (23 percent) and the city of Zürich (18 percent).

The Zürich Airport Directorate was affiliated to the Cantonal Economics Directorate and the formal owner of the airport as a whole. Its responsibilities included the construction and operation of the civil engineering works (slopes, taxiways), the airport operation, the negotiation and implementation of the company regulations and the political representation of the airport.

The privatization of the FIG and the steady growth of the airport led to the political advance of Zürich Airport becoming independent and the FDZ was removed from the cantonal administration and merged with the FIG. A new airport act was drafted on the initiative and approved by the Cantonal Council with 60 percent yes votes on 12 July 1999. The airport act was submitted to the Zürich voters for approval on 28 November and accepted by them with 61 per cent of votes.

This created the basis for the new company, and the new Airport Act came into effect on 1 March 2000. Based on three merger agreements between the FIG and the Canton of Zürich, an increase in the share capital from originally 70 million (140,000 registered shares of 500 Swiss francs) to a new 245'615,000 Swiss francs (4'912'300 registered shares of 50 Swiss francs) was made, and the FDZ was integrated into the FIG, which commenced operations on 1 April as Flughafen Zürich AG (FZAG).

From its founding until April 2010, FZAG was nicknamed Unique, while in official publications the name Unique (Flughafen Zürich AG) was used; the Unique brand is now only used for activities abroad. Since 12 April 2000, the company has been listed on the SWX; the Canton of Zürich had 78.1 percent of the share capital of the company on the first day, as a result of the restructuring. The shares were continuously reduced, but the share of FZAG in this first stage of privatization was not allowed to fall below a 50 per cent share as the operating license was issued until 1 June 2001 in the Canton of Zürich. After the operating concession had been transferred to FZAG, the canton was able to reduce its share to a prescribed minimum of 33.33 percent. The concession to operate Zürich Airport, issued by the Swiss Federal Department of Environment, Transport, Energy and Communications on 31 May 2001, has a term of 50 years, from 1 June 2001 to 31 May 2051.

In December 2001, FZAG founded the subsidiary Unique Airports Worldwide AG, which allows them to operate and participate in airports all over the world.

Investments 
Through the company A-port Operaciones S.A., Chile, the company holds a majority in the management and operation of certain airports in Latin America and the Caribbean. These include the three regional airports Florianópolis-Hercílio Luz International Airport, Puerto Montt, Iquique and Antofagasta, as well as other airports in Colombia and Honduras as well as in Curaçao.

The participation in the Santiago Mariño Caribbean International Airport in Venezuela was expropriated by the state in 2010. An arbitration court was therefore called upon and decided that the State of Venezuela had to pay USD 14.2 million by the end of 2014, half of which is attributable to Flughafen Zürich AG In India, Unique held 17 percent of the equity capital of Bangalore International Airport Ltd. (BIAL) during the construction phase, and was the owner and operator of the newly opened Bangalore airport in 2008; the share holdings were reduced to 5 per cent in 2009, and they are to be sold in 2017. On 29 November 2019,they were awarded bid to construct Jewar Airport, and operate it for 40 years.

In March 2017, Flughafen Zürich AG announced it had acquired 100% of Brazil's Hercílio Luz International Airport, and will operate it under a concession until 2047. The company also has stakes in the operation of airports in Belo Horizonte, Bogotá, Curaçao, Antofagasta, Iquique, and Bangalore. More recently, the company has also won the concession to operate both Eurico de Aguiar Salles Airport in Vitória and Joaquim de Azevedo Mancebo Airport in Macaé, Brazil.

Corporate Governance 
The company has its legal seat in Kloten and falls within the jurisdiction of the district court Bülach. Since March 2001, the airport administration has been centrally located in the new administration building, Unique One, in the west area of the airport, on the border of Rümlang.

CEO of the company is Stephan Widrig, who took over this position in the beginning of 2015. The ten-member board of directors also comprises three representatives of the cantonal and one of the municipal governments of Zürich; this principle has been criticized by the business community, and has meanwhile changed. The government council now delegates one of its own members as well as two external representatives. The Board of Directors is composed as follows: Andreas Schmid (President), Vincent Albers, Guglielmo L. Brentel, Josef Felder, Stephan Gemkow, Corine Mauch, Eveline Saupper (Vice President) and Carmen Walker Spaeh. The auditor of Flughafen Zürich AG is EY AG, headquartered in Zürich.

Shareholders 
The registered shares of Flughafen Zürich AG are traded on the SIX Swiss Exchange (Valorennummer 1'056'796, SIX symbol FHZN); Major shareholders are the Canton of Zürich with 33.33 percent of the shares and the city of Zürich with 5.05 percent, where as the FZAG is organized as a mixed-economy company.

The Articles of Incorporation contain an opting-up clause, which provides for an offer obligation for minority shareholders to exceed the limit of 49%, in the event of a change of control.

Key Figures

Publications 
Flughafen Zürich AG publishes periodical journals, which are also available on the Internet. Homebase is the internal "house newspaper" of FZAG and is primarily aimed at the employees; Unique! was until July 2005, the residents magazine of the company, and was replaced with the new Air Magazine.

References

External links 
 Flughafen Zürich AG

Transport in the canton of Zürich
Companies based in the canton of Zürich
Airport operators
Companies listed on the SIX Swiss Exchange
Swiss companies established in 2000
Transport companies established in 2000